Agra or AGRA may refer to:

Places

Asia 
 Agra, a city in Uttar Pradesh and site of the Taj Mahal
 Agra Subah, a Mughal top-level imperial province
 Agra Province, a former region of British India
 Agra Presidency, a former region of British India
 Agra division, an administrative unit of the Indian state of Uttar Pradesh
 Agra district, a district within the Agra division
 Agra Fort, located in Agra, India, also known as Lal Qila, Fort Rouge and Red Fort of Agra
 Agra (Lok Sabha constituency), a parliamentary constituency in Uttar Pradesh
 Agra, Bhopal, a village in Madhya Pradesh, India
 Agra (union council), an administrative unit in the Khyber Pakhtunkhwa province of Pakistan
 Agra, Punjab, a town in the Punjab province of Pakistan
 Agra, Sindh, a town in the Sindh province of Pakistan

Europe 
 Agra, Lombardy, a municipality in Italy, located in the province of Varese
 Agra, Switzerland, a former municipality now located in Collina d'Oro
 Agra, Kalloni, a village on the island of Lesbos in Greece
 Agra, Rhodope, a settlement in the Rhodope regional unit, Greece
 Agra, a sanctuary of the goddess Demeter near the river Ilissus

North America 
 Agra, Kansas, a city in Phillips County, US
 Agra, Oklahoma, a town in Lincoln County, US

People 
 Agra (given name)
 Agra (surname)

Film and television 
Agra (2020 film), a forthcoming film

Other uses 
Agra (beetle), a genus of carabid beetles
AGRA, a Canadian engineering design and services company, specialising in construction engineering, merged into AMEC in 2001
Alliance for a Green Revolution in Africa (AGRA)
Army Group Royal Artillery (AGRA), a British military formation type during World War II

See also
 Agara (disambiguation)
 Agrabad
 Agora (disambiguation)
 Conagra